Overdue was the final LP album by The Sandpipers, released by Satril Records in 1976 in the U.K. with catalog number SATL 4006.  Other international releases included Australia (RCA VPL1 4048), Germany (Jupiter 28 654 OT), Japan (Satril YX-7145-SR, different cover, different track order, titled Singapore Girl), New Zealand (RCA VPL1 4048), Philippines (Satril SATL-4006, different cover, different track order), and Venezuela (Satril LP-S-11501, titled Atrasado). Spanish releases occurred in 1978 (Satril 77-ST1) and again in 1984 (Satril E-30.271). The album was not released in the U.S.

Overdue contained several songs co-written by group member Jim Brady. Original member Richard Shoff returned for the album with Gary Duckworth replacing original member Michael Piano.

Of the three singles released from the album, one, a disco version of Hang On Sloopy, charted at #32 on the U.K. singles chart.  Another track, "You're A Great Way To Fly (Singapore Girl)", was released as a promotional item in 1979 by Singapore Airlines.

Track listing
"Hang On Sloopy" (Russell/Farrell) 3:30
"I'll Never Love Anyone Anymore" (Andrew/Chiles) 3:45
"Broken Slumber"(Brady/Seeburg) 3:15
"Island (Without A Name)" (Brady/Bobbitt) 3:12
"Skidrow Joe" (Brady/Bobbitt) 3:41
"Living Is A Lovin' Thing" (J. Duncan) 2:55
"Life Is a Song Worth Singing" (Bell/Creed) 3:12
"Crying In The Rain Again" (Coe/Mitchell) 2:57
"Moonlight" (L. Andrew) 3:57
"Love In Your Heart" (Coe/Mitchell) 2:38
"You're A Great Way To Fly (Singapore Girl)" (Bongusto/Hart) 2:41
"The Last Time" (Brady/Bobbitt) 3:56

Production
 Producers: Henry Hadaway and The Sandpipers (all tracks except "Singapore Girl" produced by Bongolisto (sic)/Hart/de Walden)
 Arrangers: John Altman, Paul Rodriguez, Colin Dudman
 Vocal Arrangements: Jim Brady & Richard Shoff
 Studio: Recorded at Pye Studios and Zodiac Sound, London (except "The Last Time" recorded at Burbank Studios, California); mixed at Pye Studios and D.J.M Studios, London; mastered at Pye Studios.
 Recording Engineers: Kim Maxwell, Alan Lucas
 Mixing Engineers: Kim Maxwell, John Cooper
 Cutting Engineer: Gordon Vickary
 Musicians: Barry de Sousa (drums), Paul Westwood (bass guitar), Rick Hitchcock (lead & rhythm guitar), Pete Massey (rhythm guitar), Pete Lemer (keyboards), Duncan Kinell (percussion), John Altman (baritone saxophone), Pat Kyle (tenor saxophone), Pete Thoms (trombone), David Spence (trumpet); strings led by Gerry Richards.
 Cover photographs: Chuck Wolff
 Sleeve design/graphics: Rainbow

References

The Sandpipers albums
1977 albums
A&M Records albums